The Conway Scenic Railroad  is a heritage railroad in North Conway, New Hampshire, United States, owned by Profile Mountain Holdings Corp. The railroad operates over two historic railway routes: a line from North Conway to Conway that was formerly part of the Conway Branch of the Boston and Maine Railroad, and a line from North Conway through Crawford Notch to Fabyan that was once part of the Mountain Division of the Maine Central Railroad. The Conway line is owned by Conway Scenic, and the Mountain Division is owned by the State of New Hampshire.

The railroad's main terminal is located in historic downtown North Conway in the Mount Washington valley. The station complex has been listed on the National Register of Historic Places since 1979.

History
The Conway Scenic Railroad was formed by Dwight Smith, who was an employee of the Boston and Maine Railroad in the late 1960s. After years of negotiations, Smith was able to convince his employer to sell a portion of the Conway Branch, which it planned to abandon, to him and two local businessmen in 1974, and the Conway Scenic Railroad began that year. In 1999, the original owners were bought out by husband and wife Russ and Dot Seybold and on January 30, 2018, the railroad was sold again to Profile Mountain Holdings Corp.

Operations 
The railroad operates passenger trains out of its station in North Conway Village from April to December each year.

Special freight operation 
On June 20, 2009, a 20-axle Schnabel car was brought down through Crawford Notch carrying a 227-ton transformer for Public Service of New Hampshire, an electrical utility company. The train was led by locomotives 573, 6505 and 6516. It was the first scheduled freight train through Crawford Notch since September 3, 1983, and the first freight train of any kind since October 1984. The empty cars were shipped out nine days later, led by 6505 and 4266. This shipment completed the first and only revenue freight move for the Conway Scenic to date.

Equipment

Locomotives

Former units

Appearances in film
In the 2005 Christmas television film, The 12 Dogs of Christmas, starring Jordan-Claire Green, the museum's depot was filmed in several scenes during the beginning of the film, and the Conway Scenic's passenger cars were also used in the film.

See also
North Conway Depot and Railroad Yard
List of heritage railroads in the United States
List of heritage railroads in New Hampshire
List of heritage railways

References

External links

Conway Scenic Railroad official website

Heritage railroads in New Hampshire
Transportation in Carroll County, New Hampshire
Transportation in Coös County, New Hampshire
Tourist attractions in Carroll County, New Hampshire
Tourist attractions in Coös County, New Hampshire
North Conway, New Hampshire